State Route 64 (SR 64) is a  long north–south state highway in the northwestern portion of the U.S. state of Ohio. The southern terminus of SR 64 is at an interchange with Interstate 75 (I-75) in Bowling Green which also doubles as the western terminus of SR 105. Continuing north into Michigan's Lenawee County is county-maintained Loar Highway.

Route description
SR 64 traverses portions of Wood, Lucas and Fulton Counties.  There is no portion of this route that is included within the National Highway System (NHS).  The NHS is a network of highways identified as being most important for the economy, mobility and defense of the country.

History
The SR 64 designation was established in 1923.  At its inception, SR 64 followed the majority of its present routing, traveling from downtown Bowling Green to its present northern terminus at the Michigan state line just outside Metamora.

The only significant change to take place to the routing of SR 64 was an extension at the southern end that happened in 1969.  Coinciding with the completions of both I-75 on the east side of Bowling Green, and the U.S. Route 6 (US 6) bypass of the city to the south, SR 64 was extended east from the present SR 25 (former US 25) intersection in downtown Bowling Green along the former routing of US 6 on Main Street to its present southern terminus at the junction of I-75 and SR 105.

Major junctions

References

064
064
Ohio State Route 64
064